Elias Diaz Peña is a Paraguayan environmentalist. He was awarded the Goldman Environmental Prize in 2000, jointly with Oscar Rivas, for their efforts to protect the ecosystems of the Paraná River and the Paraguay River.

References 

Year of birth missing (living people)
Living people
Paraguayan environmentalists
Goldman Environmental Prize awardees